AM2 can refer to:

 Socket AM2, a CPU socket for AMD desktop processors
 Sega AM2, a research and development team for the video game company Sega
 Arp-Madore 2, an open star cluster
 a fictional element from The Sten Chronicles
 Animusic
 AM2 or AM², a yearly anime convention in its 2nd year held in Anaheim, California.
 Achievement Measurement 2, a practical skills test required for becoming an electrician within Britain
 British Rail Class 302, a class of Electric Multiple Units originally known as AM2
 Air mass 2, the solar spectra after passing through two atmosphere thicknesses. 
 A⋅m2, a unit of magnetic moment equivalent to J/T.